Don't Tell the Bride may refer to:
 Don't Tell the Bride (British TV series)
 Don't Tell the Bride (Australian TV series)
 Don't Tell the Bride (Irish TV series)